George Browne, Count von Browne in the nobility of the Holy Roman Empire (15 June 1698 – 18 February 1792), was an Irish soldier of fortune who became full general in the Russian service.

Browne was descended from a family that could trace its descent to the time of William the Conqueror, and had settled in Ireland at a very early period. His immediate ancestors were the Brownes of Camas, Limerick, where he was born 15 June 1698. He was educated at Limerick diocesan school.

A Catholic and a Jacobite, Browne, like several of his other relations, sought scope for his ambition in a foreign military career (Flight of the Wild Geese). In his twenty-seventh year he entered the service of the Electoral Palatinate, from which he passed in 1730 to that of Russian Empire. He distinguished himself in the Polish, French, and Turkish wars, and had risen to the rank of general, with the command of 30,000 men, when he was taken prisoner by the Turks. After being sold three times as a slave to an Albanian, he obtained his freedom through the intervention of the French ambassador Villeneuve, at the instance of the Russian court, and, remaining for some time at Constantinople in his slave's costume, succeeded in discovering important state secrets which he carried to Saint Petersburg.

In recognition of this special service Browne was raised by Anna to the rank of major-general, and in this capacity accompanied General Lacy on his first expedition to Finland. On the outbreak of the Swedish war his tactical skill was displayed to great advantage in checking Swedish attacks on Livonia. In the Seven Years' War he rendered important assistance as lieutenant-general under his cousin Maximilian Ulysses, Reichsgraf von Browne.

Browne's fortunate diversion of the enemy's attacks at Kolin, 18 June 1757, contributed materially to the allied victory, and in token of her appreciation of his conduct on the occasion Maria Theresa presented him with a snuff-box set with brilliants and adorned with her portrait. At Zorndorf, 25 August 1758, he again distinguished himself in a similar manner, his opportune assistance of the right wing at the most critical moment of the battle changing almost inevitable defeat into victory. By Peter III he was named general-in-chief, and appointed to the chief command in the Danish war.

On his addressing a remonstrance to the czar against the war as impolitic, Browne was deprived of his honours and commanded to leave the country, but the czar, repenting of his hasty decision, recalled him three days afterward and appointed him Governor of Livonia. He was confirmed in the office under Catherine II who granted him Smiltene Manor, and for thirty years to the close of his life administered its affairs with remarkable practical sagacity, and with great advantage both to the supreme government and to the varied interests of the inhabitants. He died 18 February 1792 in Riga.

Browne's son Johann Georg von Browne, also an officer in the Russian army, was a patron of Ludwig van Beethoven.

References

Further reading 
 Michael Johann von der Borch: Histoire de la vie de George de Browne, comte du Saint-Empire, gouverneur général de Livonie et d'Esthonie, général en chef des armées des Sa Majesté l'impératice de toutes les Russies, chevalier des ordres de St. André, St. Alexandre Newski et St. Wlodimir de Russie, de l'aigle blanc de Pologne, et de Ste. Anne de Holstein, seigneur héréditaire des terres de Smilten, Segewold, Palkmar et Galenhoff etc. etc. I. F. Hartknoch, Riga 1794 (digital copy)
 Stefan Michael Newerkla: Die irischen Reichsgrafen von Browne-Camus in russischen und österreichischen Diensten. Vom Vertrag von Limerick (1691) bis zum Tod ihres Hausfreunds Ludwig van Beethoven (1827) [= The Irish counts of Browne-Camus in Russian and Austrian service. From the Treaty of Limerick (1691) to the death of their friend Ludwig van Beethoven (1827)]. In: Lazar Fleishman – Stefan Michael Newerkla – Michael Wachtel (eds.): Скрещения судеб. Literarische und kulturelle Beziehungen zwischen Russland und dem Westen. A Festschrift for Fedor B. Poljakov (= Stanford Slavic Studies, Volume 49). Peter Lang, Berlin et al. 2019, pp. 43–68.
 Stefan Michael Newerkla: Das irische Geschlecht O'Reilly und seine Verbindungen zu Österreich und Russland [The Irish O'Reilly family and their connections to Austria and Russia]. In: Diachronie – Ethnos – Tradition: Studien zur slawischen Sprachgeschichte [Diachrony – Ethnos – Tradition: Studies in Slavic Language History]. Eds. Jasmina Grković-Major, Natalia B. Korina, Stefan M. Newerkla, Fedor B. Poljakov, Svetlana M. Tolstaja. Tribun EU, Brno 2020, pp. 259–279 (open access), here pp. 259–261.
Attribution

External links
 Count George de Browne in: Alfred Webb A Compendium of Irish Biography; comprising sketches of distinguished Irishmen, and of eminent persons connected with Ireland by office or by their writings. 1878

1698 births
1792 deaths
18th-century Irish people
Emigrants from the Kingdom of Ireland to the Russian Empire
Military personnel from Limerick (city)
Russian military personnel of the Seven Years' War
Irish soldiers
Estonian people of Irish descent
Recipients of the Order of the White Eagle (Poland)
Wild Geese (soldiers)